Barry Banks may refer to:

Barry Banks (tenor) (born 1960), English lyric tenor
Barry Banks (rugby league), English former rugby league footballer